Shivaji Rajah Bhonsle Chattrapathi (born 1957) is the current head of the Maratha royal family of Thanjavur and the titular king of Thanjavur.

References
 Princely tales at The Hindu
 

Indian royalty
Maharajas of Thanjavur
Living people
1969 births